Ealing is a lightly populated rural locality on the bank of the Rangitata River in the Canterbury region of New Zealand's South Island. It has a community hall, a small combined Protestant faith church and a rural fire unit based in the centre of the town. Ealing was settled as a railway village in the 1870s whilst the Main South Line's bridge over the Rangitata River was being built. Along with the schools in nearby Lynnford and Maronan, the local school was  shut due to population decline during the 1930s and students sent to the primary school in Hinds, a small nearby town to the northeast and Carew in the west. The former school building is now the church. Ealing is more a common locality than a settlement, with the area being referred to as the "Ealing district". Each year a Guy Fawkes Night fireworks display and a Christmas party in Ealing District Hall are held to foster community spirit.

Demographics

Ealing-Lowcliffe had a population of 1,551 at the 2018 New Zealand census, an increase of 156 people (11.2%) since the 2013 census, and an increase of 354 people (29.6%) since the 2006 census. There were 558 households. There were 837 males and 714 females, giving a sex ratio of 1.17 males per female. The median age was 30.4 years (compared with 37.4 years nationally), with 405 people (26.1%) aged under 15 years, 360 (23.2%) aged 15 to 29, 705 (45.5%) aged 30 to 64, and 84 (5.4%) aged 65 or older.

Ethnicities were 74.9% European/Pākehā, 7.9% Māori, 2.1% Pacific peoples, 16.8% Asian, and 5.8% other ethnicities (totals add to more than 100% since people could identify with multiple ethnicities).

The proportion of people born overseas was 28.6%, compared with 27.1% nationally.

Although some people objected to giving their religion, 45.5% had no religion, 42.7% were Christian, 1.7% were Hindu, 0.2% were Muslim, 1.0% were Buddhist and 2.1% had other religions.

Of those at least 15 years old, 207 (18.1%) people had a bachelor or higher degree, and 189 (16.5%) people had no formal qualifications. The median income was $42,400, compared with $31,800 nationally. The employment status of those at least 15 was that 720 (62.8%) people were employed full-time, 183 (16.0%) were part-time, and 30 (2.6%) were unemployed.

References 

 

Ashburton District
Populated places in Canterbury, New Zealand